Bolshetuganeyevo (Olo Tuğanay) is a rural locality (a village) in Tyuldinsky Selsoviet, Kaltasinsky District, Bashkortostan, Russia. The population was 314 as of 2010. There are 4 streets.

Geography 
Bolshetuganeyevo is located 9 km north of Kaltasy (the district's administrative centre) by road. Tyuldi is the nearest rural locality.

References 

Rural localities in Kaltasinsky District